The Odisha Legislative Assembly is the unicameral state legislature of Odisha state in India. The seat of the Legislative Assembly is at Bhubaneswar, the capital of the state. The Legislative Assembly comprises 147 Members of Legislative Assembly.  Out of total 147 Assembly Constituencies of Odisha Legislative Assembly, 33 seats are reserved for Scheduled Tribes (ST) and 24 seats for the Scheduled Castes (SC). It was announced by Odisha Chief Minister Naveen Patnaik that the Sachivalaya or the Secretariat building in Bhubaneswar will be called Lok Seva Bhavan.

History

Sessions of Odisha Legislative Assembly & Speakers
The following is the list of Odisha Legislative Assembly sittings:

Leaders of Opposition

Members of Legislative Assembly

See also
 Government of Odisha
 List of constituency of Odisha legislative assembly

References

External links
 Odisha Legislative Assembly website 

 
State legislatures of India